William IX may refer to:

 William IX of Aquitaine (1071–1126)
 William IX, Count of Poitiers (1153–1156)
 William IX of Montferrat (1494–1518)
 Wilhelm, Duke of Jülich-Cleves-Berg (1516–1592)
 William I, Elector of Hesse (or Hesse-Cassel), also known as William IX, Landgrave of Hesse-Kassel, (1743–1821)